Mangapapa is a suburb of the New Zealand city of Gisborne. It is located in the north of the city. Whataupoko lies to the southeast and Te Hapara to the south, separated from Mangapapa by the Taruheru River.

Gisborne Hospital is located in Mangapapa, as was the former Cook Hospital.

The population was estimated to be  in

Demographics

Mangapapa had a population of 4,530 at the 2018 New Zealand census, an increase of 336 people (8.0%) since the 2013 census, and an increase of 270 people (6.3%) since the 2006 census. There were 1,554 households, comprising 2,193 males and 2,340 females, giving a sex ratio of 0.94 males per female, with 1,134 people (25.0%) aged under 15 years, 948 (20.9%) aged 15 to 29, 1,887 (41.7%) aged 30 to 64, and 558 (12.3%) aged 65 or older.

Ethnicities were 63.2% European/Pākehā, 50.7% Māori, 4.6% Pacific peoples, 3.6% Asian, and 1.5% other ethnicities. People may identify with more than one ethnicity.

The percentage of people born overseas was 9.2, compared with 27.1% nationally.

Although some people chose not to answer the census's question about religious affiliation, 53.1% had no religion, 33.6% were Christian, 3.2% had Māori religious beliefs, 0.3% were Hindu, 0.2% were Muslim, 0.4% were Buddhist and 1.6% had other religions.

Of those at least 15 years old, 459 (13.5%) people had a bachelor's or higher degree, and 762 (22.4%) people had no formal qualifications. 333 people (9.8%) earned over $70,000 compared to 17.2% nationally. The employment status of those at least 15 was that 1,716 (50.5%) people were employed full-time, 510 (15.0%) were part-time, and 168 (4.9%) were unemployed.

Parks

Atkinson Street Park is a local park and dog walking area, located in Mangapapa.

Education

References

External links
 Mangapapa school website
 QuickStats About Mangapapa, Statistics New Zealand

Suburbs of Gisborne, New Zealand